Guangdong International Trust and Investment Corporation (GITIC) was one of People's Republic of China's largest state-owned companies. On January 16, 1999, its bankruptcy was the biggest in the history of the country to date.

References 

Economy of China
Banking in China
Companies that have filed for bankruptcy in the People's Republic of China